Black Lake tram stop is a tram stop in Black Lake in the West Midlands, England. It was opened on 31 May 1999 and is situated on Midland Metro Line 1 that links Birmingham and Wolverhampton. It is also has Park and ride facilities. The stop is situated near to the site of the former Swan Village railway station, which closed in 1972.  The railway station was on the opposite side of the level crossing and was the junction of the line through Great Bridge and on to Dudley via the currently mothballed South Staffordshire Line.

Services
Mondays to Fridays, Midland Metro services in each direction between Birmingham and Wolverhampton run at six to eight-minute intervals during the day, and at fifteen-minute intervals during the evenings and on Sundays. They run at eight minute intervals on Saturdays.

References

External links

 Article on this Metro stop from Rail Around Birmingham & the West Midlands
 Article on this Metro stop from thetrams.co.uk

West Midlands Metro stops
Transport in Sandwell
Railway stations in Great Britain opened in 1999